Events from the year 1913 in Sweden

Incumbents
 Monarch – Gustaf V
 Prime Minister - Karl Staaff

Events
 1 January – The National Board of Health and Welfare is founded
 7–16 February – The Nordic Games take place in Stockholm.
 27 April – The Swedish Olympic Committee is established.
 Date unknown – Foundation of the Samfundet De Nio.

Births

 16 February - Tage Holmberg, film editor (died 1989)

Deaths

 2 February - Gustaf de Laval, engineer and inventor  (born 1845)
 2 February - Hans Hildebrand, archeologist  (born 1842)
 26 April – Eva Brag, journalist, novelist and poet  (born 1829)
 Emma Schenson, photographer  (born 1827)

References

 
Years of the 20th century in Sweden
Sweden